La Belle Image (1941) is a novel by French writer Marcel Aymé that has been described as "Kafka's Metamorphosis in reverse."

Composition 
After France and the United Kingdom declared war on Germany on 3 September 1939, and during the Battle of France, Aymé was in Cape Ferret, but returned to Paris at the end of August. La Belle Image was begun during the summer of 1940 and completed between September and October of that year. Aymé believed that the war would last at least ten years, and his pessimistic mood is apparent throughout the novel.

It was published by Gallimard towards the end of January 1941.

Plot 
La Belle Image is the story of Raoul Cerusier, an upstanding, hard-working, but suspicious businessman, whose dull and unattractive face is transformed into one that is young, handsome, and seductive. His office colleagues no longer recognize him, nor does his wife, whom he must then seduce, thereby cuckolding himself.

English translations 
La Belle Image was translated as The Second Face by Norman Denny for the Bodley Head in 1951 and by Sophie Lewis as Beautiful Image for Pushkin Press in 2008; Denny's translation has also appeared under the title The Grand Seduction.

Film adaptation
The book was filmed by Claude Heymann in 1951.

See also
 The Face of Another by Kōbō Abe, a novel with a similar premise

References 

1941 French novels
Novels by Marcel Aymé